Warwick Birrell Wright (born 2 June 1946 in Hamilton) is a former field hockey player who represented New Zealand at the 1972 Summer Olympics in Munich.

References

External links
 

New Zealand male field hockey players
Olympic field hockey players of New Zealand
Field hockey players at the 1972 Summer Olympics
1946 births
Living people
Sportspeople from Hamilton, New Zealand